Waving At The Astronauts is an album by Lifeguards, a side project of Robert Pollard and Doug Gillard, released in 2011.

Track listing
All songs written by Robert Pollard and Doug Gillard

Paradise Is Not So Bad - 4.46
Nobody's Milk - 3.35
(Doing The) Math - 4.40
Product Head - 3.53
You're Gonna Need A Mountain - 5.46
Sexless Auto - 3.13
Trip The Web - 4.01
They Called Him So Much - 3.05
Keep It In Orbit - 4.01
What Am I? - 4.12

Personnel
Robert Pollard - lead vocals
Doug Gillard - Instruments

References

2011 albums